The history of animation in the United Kingdom began at the very origins of the artform in the late 19th century. British animation has been strengthened by an influx of émigrés to the UK; renowned animators such as Lotte Reiniger (Germany), John Halas (Hungary), George Dunning and Richard Williams (Canada), Terry Gilliam and Tim Burton (United States) have all worked in the UK at various stages of their careers. Notable full-length animated features to be produced in the UK include Animal Farm (1954), Yellow Submarine (1968), Watership Down (1978), and Wallace & Gromit: The Curse of the Were-Rabbit (2005).

Conceptualising British animation history
The history of British animation has gone through several stages of development, significantly influenced by both internal and international political, economic and cultural factors. Important among these is the relative impact of the international animation industry, which in several instances has been seen as both a challenge to produce more local content, and as a creative and/or commercial inspiration to follow or work against.

In order to clarify the emergence and interplay of the different agendas, aesthetics and industrial relationships that have shaped British animation history, media scholar Van Norris posits a rough chronological taxonomy of animation's development in the UK along three distinct "waves", the first comprising the establishment of the British animation industry, the second detailing the impact of the incursion of dissident politics, fringe artistic communities and emergent distribution systems in the industry, and the third representing the neoliberal re-consolidation of all of these tendencies into more commercially driven and comedic popular media.

Early experiments in form and commerce
Animation was once thought to have been based on the phenomenon of 'persistence of vision', first identified in a paper by Peter Mark Roget published in 1825 by the Royal Society titled "Explanation of an Optical Deception in the Appearance of the Spokes of a Wheel Seen through Vertical Apertures."  It is now thought, however, that the illusion of movement in animation is due to the way in which the visual perception areas of our brain map movement in the real world. Our brain is thought to perceive movement by taking individual snapshots of the visual field and inducing that movement has occurred due to the changing position of things. Hence the brain interprets the quick succession of animated frames as moving images, as opposed to a succession of still images.

Belgian scientist Joseph Plateau introduced stroboscopic animation in 1833 and in the same year published his own designs with Ackermann in London as the Phantasmascope and later as the Fantascope, after the device had become known as the phénakistiscope through a publisher in Paris. Many British stroboscopic disc releases followed.

In 1872, English-born Eadweard Muybridge, a photographer living in San Francisco, started his series of sequential photographs of animals in motion. Books of his work are still widely used for reference by artists and animators.

"Matches Appeal", produced by Arthur Melbourne-Cooper of St. Albans for the Bryant May match company is thought to have been a 1899 stop motion commercial (according to Dutch researchers Tjitte de Vries and Ati Mul). In this film, stop-frame puppets made of matches were filmed frame by frame as they wrote on a blackboard. According to Elaine Burrows of the British Film Institute, the first animated film proper made in Britain was Cooper's Dolly's Toys, produced in 1901, and featuring a mixture of live-action and stop-motion puppetry. In 1925, Cardiff-based animator Sid Griffiths working with Brian White, created the silent short Jerry the Tyke for Pathe, which was shown on their fortnightly magazine, Pathe Pictorial, on cinema screens around the world. Griffiths and Brian White set up together in Charing Cross Road, London in 1929, producing animated advertisements for the Superads agency.

First wave: Establishment of an industry
By the 1930s, as commercial animation was established in the US, in the UK the creation of Government public information films from the GPO (Post Office) unit and later wartime and post-war information films allowed for greater experimentation than the more market driven work across the Atlantic. Established by documentary maker John Grierson the GPO Film Unit produced many films using animation as Grierson believed it was an ideal medium to communicate information. For these films he hired experimental animators such as Norman McLaren and Len Lye who would go on to make many more films and in the case of McLaren to later head up Griersons National Film Board of Canada animation department.

These GPO productions and the many wartime propaganda films led to an industry of animators with a diversity of design styles, well versed in conveying messages efficiently and clearly. As Van Norris notes, the influence of the combined demand from smaller commercial and governmental contracts would encourage the development of a variety of boutique production companies, as opposed to the more monolithic system developing concurrently in the United States.  Coming from this background, Halas and Batchelor maintained their position as one of the leading European animation companies, producing many commercials and short films during most of the second half of the twentieth century and were responsible for producing the influential and ground breaking animated feature Animal Farm in 1954, a departure from the predominantly US-sourced animated films being exhibited at the time for its explicitly political content and more adult-oriented tone. Future animation production in the UK would likewise maintain a generally darker tone than U.S.-based productions.

Emergence of children's TV
The popularisation of television broadcasting in the UK during the 1950s brought with it both new avenues for animation production and a shift in the demographic orientation of animation to the realms of children's programming. The year 1950 saw the premier of the long-running children's TV series Watch with Mother (1950–74) which would not include animation per se, but would feature several puppet-based segments (such as "Andy Pandy" and "Flower Pot Men") that would later become staples of British children's popular imagery and animation. Such is the case as well with the children's book character Noddy, who has appeared in various iterations and with different means of animation ranging from stop-motion to CGI to this day. The BBC's investment in resources and personnel oriented to children's media during this time would also provide avenues for the service's eventual inclusion of animation—particularly stop-motion animation, which could be derived from some of the same resources and skill-sets as live action puppetry. Puppeteer Gordon Murray for example, would  branch off from his work on the "Watch with Mother" segment "The Woodentops" and other live action puppet shows to create several stop motion animated children's series in the 1960s, including "Camberwick Green" (1966), "Trumpton" (1967) and "Chigley" (1969). Modelmaker Peter Firmin and writer Oliver Postgate similarly created several stop-motion animated works for children during this period, including "Pingwings" (1961–1964), "Pogles' Wood" (1966–1967) and "Clangers" (1969–1972). It is during this period that ties between the UK's children's animation and several other British media and literary tendencies consolidated, with shows of this period providing a blueprint for future children's TV focussing on rural communities and day-to-day interpersonal relationships. Within this tendency, strong ties can be seen within children's TV and much older pastoral children's literature, social realist cinema and documentary, and the theatrical comedy of manners. This transition from puppetry to stop-motion also demonstrates the influence of Eastern European animation (such as that of Czech animator Jiří Trnka and his followers), with its own proclivity for wood and felt animation puppets and often static facial features. Trnka's work helped to inspire British production companies, including Pete Bryden and Ed Cookson's BBC-commissioned stop-frame animated children's series Summerton Mill (2005).

Aesthetics and influence
The later impact of the music and film industries that brought the UK to the cultural fore during the 1960s and early 1970s created new markets and areas of influence for British pop culture in general, with UK-based animation benefiting as well. The 1968 animated feature film Yellow Submarine featuring characters based on The Beatles and their music and produced by London's TVC Animation, was a worldwide success, and was highly influential in the course of animation and design in subsequent years for both its incorporation of psychedelic influences and the aesthetic continuity it established between these emergent aesthetics and the modernist graphic art initially developed by the US-based studio, UPA during the last few decades. A few years later, US Animator Terry Gilliam would develop his own distinctive style of anarchic cut out animation for Monty Python's Flying Circus (1969–1974) by employing similar motifs drawn from British culture, figures and localities. This deviation from the Disney-codified squash and stretch approach of theatrical animation's golden age would similarly be a staple of Britain's boutique-driven animation culture, and would inform the more experimental films and TV segments that emerged in the following decades.

In the 1970s, this experimental tendency was fostered in large part by the British television system's commitment to and experimentation with educational programming formats. "Vision On" (1964–76) for example was a show created to cater to deaf children, featuring several animated segments, as well as fostering a growing pool of animation talent. Other programs in this vein included "Take Hart", (1977-1983), a predominantly live-action educational show about art which featured some of Aardman Studio's first work, with their character Morph, who would appear in a handful of other shows as well. Other stop-motion animated programming of the 1970s included the iconic "Wombles" series, adapted from the popular children's book series.

In the realm of theatrical animation, 1978 saw the release of "Watership Down", also adapted from a popular children's novel of the same name. Like many of its internationally recognised filmic predecessors, it too proved commercially successful while at the same time featuring a much darker thematic approach to the cel-animated artform than its US contemporaries.

Second wave (1979–1996)
The growing diversity of artistic approaches fostered during the 1970s came to fruition in the next decade, helped in some cases by funding from Channel 4 in 1982. Alison de Vere, who had made "Cafe Bar" in 1975, was one of the first independent women animators to make an impact: "Mr Pascal" (1979) gained the Grand Prix at the Annecy Festival, and her masterpiece "The Black Dog" (1987) won many awards. Other women who began to emerge during the 1970s, making films with overtly feminist and political themes, include Leeds Animation Workshop (a women's collective), founded in 1978 and still in production after more than forty years; and Vera Neubauer, also still working today after almost five decades.
As a public service broadcaster formed under the remit to cater to the "tastes and interests not generally catered for" within pre-existing media, Channel 4 was a fundamental supporter of fringe media on British broadcast TV, pushing for increased representations of underexposed issues of ethnicity and sexuality, as well as fostering political critique and artistic experimentation. This, coupled with a political climate that fostered a strong cultural response from more leftist groups, provided a fertile environment for work produced by many animators who had been working on the fringes, including that of Aardman, Joanna Quinn, Alison de Vere, David Anderson, The Quay Brothers, Paul Vester, Phil Mulloy and others. In addition to providing exposure and monetary support, this fostering of fringe animators allowed many of these animators to make contact with the wider artistic and entertainment community of the UK, thereby creating strong ties in particular between animators, stand-up performers working within the alternative comedy movement, and writers and producers of live-action programming.

Though much of the animated work screened by Channel 4 during this time proved too experimental for mainstream tastes, some of it would yield global commercial successes. The television animated special The Snowman, an adaptation of Raymond Briggs' children's graphic novel, again produced by TVC Animation and directed by Dianne Jackson, was a substantial popular and financial success that remains a perennial Christmas favourite. Along similar lines, it is during this time that Aardman would break through to the mainstream as well, thanks in large part to the shorts Creature Comforts (1989) and the Wallace and Gromit films, all of which were directed by Nick Park. Stop-motion would likewise continue to have a strong presence in children's TV, with Postman Pat (1981, 1996, 2004) proving a successful franchise with multiple iterations. On a related note, mechanised puppetry mixed with limited stop-motion animation would similarly continue to be used in a few very successful shows created during this time, such as Thomas the Tank Engine (1984–2008; The show would be animated in model form for 12 seasons).

Cooperation and competition with US-based production companies
Elsewhere in the mainstream, the UK's production culture would be further bolstered by the establishment of two US-owned studios. Walt Disney Productions established a British branch during this time that would be responsible for Who Framed Roger Rabbit in 1988, and in 1991, Steven Spielberg's Amblimation would be established as well, producing several features as well as broadcast programming, including An American Tail: Fievel Goes West (1991), We're Back! A Dinosaur Story (1993), and Balto (1995). Though technically proficient, this studio's films were largely overshadowed by the concurrent Disney Renaissance, and would be closed in 1997, with some of its staff going on to join Dreamworks Animation.

In other areas of international interaction, several British animated shows produced during this time found success through syndication in the United States, including Cosgrove Hall's shows Danger Mouse (1981–1987) and Count Duckula (1988–1993), which, among others, were screened during the 1980s and early 1990s on the then-new children's cable network Nickelodeon.

The US media made its presence felt in Britain during the 1990s in other ways as well. With the explosive success of The Simpsons (1989–) and the many adult-oriented animated sitcoms that followed in its wake, not only was the British public's relationship to animation altered, so too was that of Britain's TV companies, which for their part saw the potential to generate substantial income from prime-time animated media franchises. Though Channel 4 would as such abandon its remit for fringe media in the wake of the emergence of both a less confrontational political climate during the 1990s and new narrowcasting platforms such as Sky TV (launched in 1993), the mantle of supporting animation would in turn be taken up by the wider commercial media.

Third wave (1997–present)
The late 1990s brought with them substantial changes to the British cultural and media environment. Politically, the rise of New Labour would mean a softening of leftist dissidence in alternative comedy and experimental animation. At the same time, the new government's embracing of third way politics would mean that, while it would adopt several left-leaning policies with regard to social welfare, it also embraced the market deregulation begun under the previous Conservative administration and allow broadcasters to further re-prioritise commercial interests over what was once a media environment much more directed by a public broadcasting agenda. The Broadcasting act of 1990 had already rendered Channel 4 a self-funding entity, thus making monetary profit a new priority for the broadcaster. The after effects of these changes would be at the fore of the newly established status quo of animation production, circulation and consumption. The emergence of new sources of competition in this area only accentuated this shift — particularly in the realm of children's programming, which thanks to the Sky TV system, would for the first time bring entire channels of US and international TV content to the British mediascape. With regard to children's TV (the single most concentrated sector of animated media), this would occur at first with the incursion of Nickelodeon in 1993, then Disney Channel in 1995, and Cartoon Network in 1999, with many new and derivative channels emerging since.

This rise in broadcasting competition and establishment of new priorities had several effects in the British animation production environment. To begin with, it offered further avenues for children's media producers to seek funding and distribution. This was more or less beneficial to the existing animation production community, which of course was already marked by the boutique system first established during the middle of the 20th century, thus allowing for a variety of approaches and aesthetics. In the following years, this variety of small-scale production would also provide increased opportunities for transnational cooperation between producers based in the UK and the United States, Canada, France and others. On the other hand, it also put more of an onus on commercial priorities rather than experimentation, with the general push being to adapt these fringe aesthetics and content to more mainstream tastes. In this respect, The Simpsons (and later South Park) would provide the primary blueprint, with a variety of shows produced in the following years that played with the line between adult humour and the stigma of childhood attached to animation, and further tie "adult-oriented" animated programming to the parameters of live-action sitcoms. It is leading up to and during this period that several shows aiming to marry avant garde aesthetics, subversive humour and prime-time appeal were produced, including Crapston Villas (1995–1997), Pond Life (1996–2000), Stressed Eric (1998–2000), Bob and Margaret (1998–2001), Monkey Dust (2003–2005), Modern Toss (2004–2008), I am Not an Animal (2004) and Popetown (2005), a show so surrounded by controversy that it was never able to be screened on BBC Three, the channel that originally commissioned it.

Millennial children's animation
The BBC responded to the incursion of this larger media landscape by ceding a significant amount of the children's demographic to these new channels, producing less animation for older children and instead doubling down on its flagship live-action children's programming such as Doctor Who on the one hand, and preschool programming on the other with the launch of CBeebies, a network fully devoted to early childhood programming, in 2002. Thanks to the financial success of Teletubbies in the late 1990s and early 2000s, here too an increased focus on the generation and recuperation of popular franchises can be seen. The 2000s thus witnessed the nostalgic recuperation of many once-successful (and in many cases, still screened) animated shows from the last several decades with, for example, the launch of a new Postman Pat series in 2006, as well as new animated iterations of Andy Pandy, Bill and Ben the Flowerpot Men, and Noddy. Notable original productions during the contemporary era adopt a similarly didactic tone as these shows, with maternal/paternal voiceover featuring prominently, as can be seen in Peppa Pig (2004–) and Sarah & Duck (2013–2017).

New and transnational media
During the 1990s and 2000s, the UK concurrently saw the emergence of a robust local video games industry, with derivative areas of production devoted to computer motion graphics generated in their wake. By the turn of the century the UK had generated a strong local digital animation and computer graphics industry, with London post production companies such as Framestore and Double Negative producing visual effects and computer graphics animation for a variety of local and international filmic works. On the more amateur side, several British animations online have developed international cult followings, such as the surreal Salad Fingers and Don't Hug Me I'm Scared.

Similar transnational relationships would develop between established and emerging filmic and televisual animation studios and larger foreign companies. Aardman for its part would sign co-financing and distribution deals with Dreamworks for Chicken Run (2000), Wallace and Gromit: Curse of the Were-Rabbit (2005) and Flushed Away (2006), Columbia for Arthur Christmas (2011) and Pirates! In Adventures With Scientists (2012) and StudioCanal for Shaun the Sheep Movie (2015), Early Man (2018) and Farmageddon A Shaun the Sheep Movie (2019). They would likewise produce programing and interstitials for Nickelodeon much like the ones they once made for Channel 4 in the 1980s. Cartoon Network would also foster similar relationships with British producers, with their internationally distributed flagship series The Amazing World of Gumball (2011–2019), created, written, and partially animated in the UK, with British voice actors (donning American accents) voicing many of the main characters.

Thanks in large part to the early fragmentation of the industry that created a culture of interrelating but independent production companies and auteurs, the UK has been able, even within economically restrictive moments, to continuously generate aesthetically innovative and often socially incisive animated works. Within the increasing transnationalization of commercial animation both for adults and children, British animation has managed for the most part to maintain both several markers of identity and niches within the global animation marketplace.

Highlights
1899: Arthur Melbourne-Cooper's "Matches Appeal"
1954: Animal Farm
1966: Trumptonshire Trilogy
1968: Yellow Submarine
1973: The Wombles
1974: Bagpuss
1976: Paddington
1978: Watership Down
1981: Danger Mouse
1981: Postman Pat
1982: Plague Dogs
1982: SuperTed
1984: The Wind in the Willows
1984: Thomas the Tank Engine & Friends, based on the Reverend W. Awdry's The Railway Series
1985: Dire Straits "Money for Nothing" (music video)
1985: Fireman Sam
1986: Pingu
1988: Count Duckula
1989: Wallace and Gromit debut in A Grand Day Out
1989: TUGS
1989 : Bangers and Mash
1989: The BFG1990: The Dreamstone1992: Noddy's Toyland Adventures1993: The Animals of Farthing Wood1993: The Thief and the Cobbler1993: The Wrong Trousers1995: A Close Shave1997: Stage Fright1999: Watership Down
2000: Chicken Run2000: Thomas and the Magic Railroad2004: Peppa Pig2005: Wallace and Gromit: The Curse of the Were-Rabbit2006: Flushed Away2007: Shaun the Sheep2008: Thomas & Friends switches from live-action models to CGI
2008: A Matter of Loaf and Death2011: The Amazing World of Gumball2012: The Pirates! In an Adventure with Scientists!2015: Shaun the Sheep Movie2015: Danger Mouse returns for a brand new reboot series2018: Early Man2018: Sherlock Gnomes2018: Hilda2019: Farmageddon: A Shaun the Sheep Movie2021: Ron's Gone Wrong''

References

British
British animation
Animation